The Department of Sustainability, Environment, Water, Population and Communities was an Australian government department that existed between September 2010 and September 2013.

Scope
Information about the department's functions and/or government funding allocation could be found in the Administrative Arrangements Orders, the annual Portfolio Budget Statements, in the department's annual reports and on the department's website.

At its creation, the department was responsible for:
Environment protection and conservation of biodiversity
Air quality
National fuel quality standards
Land contamination
Meteorology
Administration of the Australian Antarctic Territory, and the Territory of Heard Island and McDonald Islands
Natural, built and cultural heritage
Environmental research 
Water policy and resources
Ionospheric prediction
Co-ordination of sustainable communities policy
Population policy
Housing affordability
Built environment innovation

Structure
The department was an Australian Public Service department, staffed by officials who were responsible to the Minister for Sustainability, Environment, Water, Population and Communities.

References

Ministries established in 2010
Sustainability, Environment, Water, Population and Communities
2010 establishments in Australia
2013 disestablishments in Australia
Australia